Yemaneberhan "Yeman" Crippa (born 15 October 1996) is an Ethiopian-born Italian long-distance runner. He won the gold medal in the 10,000 metres and bronze for the 5000 metres at the European Athletics Championships in 2022, and bronze in the 10,000 m in 2018. Crippa claimed four medals in the age-group races at the European Cross Country Championships and a bronze in the senior race in 2019.

He earned the bronze medal in the 5000 m at the 2015 European Junior Championships and gold at the 2017 European U23 Championships. Crippa holds six Italian records (3000 m, 5000 m out and indoors, 10,000 m, 5 km road race and half marathon) and won five national titles.

Biography
Born in Dessie, in the north-eastern part of Ethiopia, Yemaneberhan lost his Ethiopian parents in the Eritrean–Ethiopian War and landed in an orphanage in Addis Abeba. He was adopted in 2001 by an Italian couple, Roberto and Luisa Crippa, and settled with them in Trento. He was one of the nine children adopted by the couple, together with his older brothers Nekagenet and Kelemu. At the beginning he concentrated on football before switching to running in 2007, both of his brothers also being runners.

Winning several medals in various age categories, Crippa made his senior debut at the 2016 European Championships in Amsterdam, finishing eighth in the 5000 metres. A year later, he placed seventh in the 3000 metres at the 2017 European Indoor Championships held in Belgrade.

In 2019, he set the 10,000 metres national record at the Doha World Championship with a time of 27:10.76.

Crippa represented Italy at the 2020 Tokyo Olympics, competing in the 5000 m, and 10,000 m events.

In February 2022, he broke the Italian half marathon record with a 59:26 performance in Naples, becoming the first Italian athlete to hold national records in the 3000 m, 5000 m, 10,000 m and half marathon. Crippa enjoyed a successful year by winning European 10,000 m gold and bronze in the 5000 m at Munich 2022.

Achievements

Personal bests
 800 metres: 1:50.16 (Trento 2016)
 1000 metres indoor: 2:32.88 (Ancona 2013)
 1500 metres: 3:35.26 (Rovereto 2020)
 1500 metres indoor: 3:51.43 (Ancona 2015)
 3000 metres: 7:37.90 (Gateshead 2021) 
 3000 metres U23: 7:43.30 (Ostrava 2018) 
 3000 metres indoor: 7:57.25 (Ancona 2016)
 5000 metres: 13:02.26 (Ostrava 2020) 
 5000 metres U23: 13:18.83 (Palo Alto, CA 2018) 
 5000 metres indoor: 13:23.99 (Birmingham 2017) 
 10,000 metres: 27:10.76 (Doha 2019) 
 10,000 metres U23: 27:44.21 (London 2018)
Road
 5 kilometres: 13:14 (Herzogenaurach 2022) 
 10 kilometres: 28:34 (Trento 2018)
 Half marathon: 59:26 (Naples 2022)

Competition record

1Representing Europe

National titles
 Italian Athletics Championships
 1500 metres: 2016
 5000 metres: 2022
 Italian Athletics Indoor Championships
 3000 metres: 2016
 Italian Cross Country Championships
 Long race: 2016, 2019

See also
Italian all-time top lists - 5000 metres
Italian all-time top lists - 10,000 metres
Naturalized athletes of Italy

References

External links
 

1996 births
Living people
Italian male cross country runners
Italian male middle-distance runners
Italian male long-distance runners
Italian sportspeople of African descent
Ethiopian emigrants to Italy
Athletes (track and field) at the 2020 Summer Olympics
Athletes (track and field) at the 2018 Mediterranean Games
Mediterranean Games bronze medalists for Italy
European Championships (multi-sport event) gold medalists
European Championships (multi-sport event) bronze medalists
European Athletics Championships winners
Mediterranean Games medalists in athletics
World Athletics Championships athletes for Italy
Athletics competitors of Fiamme Oro
Olympic athletes of Italy